The Tallinn–Tapa railway  is a  long double track partly electrified railway line in Estonia, connecting the cities of Tallinn and Tapa.

Operational use 
The line starts in Tallinn at the Baltic Station, runs through Northern Estonia in eastern direction and ends in Tapa, where it connects with railways to Narva and Tartu. It has 17 stations, including its two termini.
The line is equipped for speeds up to 120 km/h on its entire length. Ülemiste train station and Baltic Station are included into planned Rail Baltica high-speed standard gauge railway. Passenger train operators include Elron and GoRail. Lux Express Grupp announced its plans to operate the line between Tallinn and St. Petersburg with two Stadler trains. The line has a railway connection, which serves Muuga Harbour, the largest cargo port in Estonia. Large marshalling yards are located at Baltic Station, Ülemiste railway station and Tapa railway station.

History 
The railway forms together with the Tapa–Narva railway the Tallinn–Narva railway. This line was completed in 1870 and was originally a part of the railway line, which connected St. Peterburg and Paldiski through Tallinn and Narva as a part of the railway network of the Russian Empire.

Future 
The second stage of Rail Baltica development includes the modernisation of Tallinn–Tapa railway as a part of Tallinn–Riga railway, so trains could run at 160 km/h.
A new huge train station is to be built at Ülemiste in 2019, making it the largest station on the line and starting serving the whole region through Rail Baltica HSL in period 2020–2025.

Infrastructure 

The railway is maintained from the Baltic Station in Tallinn and Tapa railway station. The railway infrastructure operator is EVR Infra – a subsidiary of the national railway company Eesti Raudtee. Modernisation of interlocking of the stations will be made in 2014 and implementation of the ETCS second level is dependant from the phase of development of the technology and comes as the third stage of ERMTS implementation plan for Estonian conventional rail network in period 2019–2025.

Track 
The track is  Broad gauge. The line is electrified between Tallinn and Aegviidu using overhead lines with 3 kV DC railway electrification.

Stations 
All stations are being rebuilt according to European Council decision 2002/735/EC and Estonian standard EVS 867:2003 from a platform height of 1,100 mm to the EU standard platform height of 550 mm.

Route

From Baltic Station, trains travel around the centre of Tallinn through Kitseküla railway station heading eastwards towards Ülemiste train station. After Vesse station they leave borders of Tallinn and continue in a south-eastern direction through Harju County and Lääne-Viru County till Jäneda station, crossing several rivers on their way. After Jäneda the railway runs mainly in eastward direction till the end point in Tapa, where it splits to railways to Tartu and Narva.

As railway electrification ends in Aegviidu, this station serves as a terminus station for Elron EMUs in eastern direction.

Services are operated by Elron Stadler FLIRT trains, which replaced the DMU and EMU rolling stock of Edelaraudtee and Elektriraudtee.

See also 
 Edelaraudtee
 Eesti Raudtee
 Elektriraudtee
 GoRail
 Rail transport in Estonia

References 

Railway lines in Estonia
Lääne-Viru County
Transport in Tallinn
Harju County